Thornbrough may refer to:

Places
Thornbrough, a civil parish in the Hambleton district of North Yorkshire, England
Thornbrough Air Force Base, previous name of Cold Bay Airport in Cold Bay, Alaska, in the United States

People
Edward Thornbrough (1754-1834), British admiral
Emma Lou Thornbrough (1913–1994), American historian

Ships

See also 
Thornborough (disambiguation)